Coldham's Common is a 49.3 hectare Local Nature Reserve in Cambridge. It is owned and managed by Cambridge City Council.

This site has areas of unimproved grassland, which have anthills of yellow meadow ants. There is also scrub and woodland. Flora include spiny rest harrow, upright brome and bee orchid.

There is access from Coldham's Lane.

References

External links
 Friends of Coldham's Common

Local Nature Reserves in Cambridgeshire